Watership Down is an animated fantasy children's television series, adapted from the 1972 novel of the same name by Richard Adams. The second adaptation of the novel (after the 1978 film), it was produced by UK's Alltime Entertainment and Canada's Decode Entertainment in association with Martin Rosen (the director of the 1978 film), with the participation of the Canadian Television Fund, the Canadian Film or Video Production Tax Credit and the Ontario Film and Television Tax Credit from the Government of Ontario.

Watership Down aired for three seasons from September 1999 to December 2001, on both YTV in Canada and CITV in the UK, though the latter didn't broadcast the final season. The series stars several well-known British actors, including Stephen Fry, Rik Mayall, Phill Jupitus, Jane Horrocks, Dawn French, John Hurt and Richard Briers (the latter two also star in the film).

Stephen Gately performed a new arrangement of Art Garfunkel's "Bright Eyes", which was included in the 1978 film, while Mike Batt (who wrote "Bright Eyes") and the Royal Philharmonic Orchestra contributed a completely new score. In 2003, composer Mike Batt was nominated for a Gemini Award for Best Original Music Score for a Dramatic Series for his work on this series. 39 episodes were produced.

Plot overview
Watership Down (with the use of the novel's basic plot) follows the lives of a group of rabbits as they leave their endangered warren in search of a safe new home. They travel across the English countryside, braving perilous danger, until they find a hill called Watership Down, where they begin a new warren. However, they are endangered by another warren, Efrafa, which is led by the authoritarian General Woundwort, and they are soon forced to defend their home and lives.

Although the series began with elements taken from the original novel, later episodes of the first series, as well as most of the second and third were almost entirely new content, with many episodes focusing solely on new characters and situations.

In addition, the third series featured a new opening sequence and somewhat altered style of animation, along with many of the original voice actors leaving, only leaving a handful of the original cast to remain. The programme became noticeably darker in tone, adding elements of mysticism and magic, and focusing on an evil new warren called Darkhaven.

Although the series was praised by younger audiences at the time of the series' air, fans of both the novel and the movie were more mixed about the series due to drastic changes from the novel (like Pipkin going from a grownup rabbit to a young rabbit and Blackberry changing from a buck to a doe) and its more child-friendly tone as compared to some of the violence of the movie.

Voice cast
Watership Down is voiced by many familiar faces in British film and television. John Hurt, the voice of Hazel in the film, returns this time as the voice of General Woundwort in the first and second seasons, and Richard Briers, the voice of Fiver in the film, appears in the series as Captain Broom. Dawn French, Jane Horrocks, Stephen Fry, Phil Jupitus and Rik Mayall all provide voices, as Buttercup, Hannah, Cowslip, Dandelion and Kehaar, respectively in both the first and second seasons. To a lesser extent, former Boyzone member Stephen Gately, who was responsible for performing a special re-working of "Bright Eyes", provides the voice of Blackavar in seasons 1 and 2, and comedy actor Stephen Mangan provides the voice of Bigwig and later, Silverweed, replacing Tim McInnerny who provided Silverweed's voice for one episode in Series 1. Actor Kiefer Sutherland was involved and voiced a new rabbit called Hickory, but only for 3 episodes, to be replaced in Series 3 by Rob Rackstraw who also provides the voice for Captain Campion. By Series 3, most of the celebrity voices were reduced and were replaced by high-profile voice actors, with only a few of the original cast reprising their roles and providing additional voices.

All seasons
Rob Rackstraw as Campion, Captain Holly, Hickory (season 3) Raincloud, Granite
Stephen Mangan as Bigwig, Silverweed (season 3) Black Rabbit of Inle, Shale
David Holt as Vervain, Bluesky, Boxwood, Darkling
Andrew Falvey as Fiver, Flax, Feldspar 
Sue Elliot Nichols as Blackberry, Tabitha
Lee Ross as Hawkbit
Richard Briers as Captain Broom

Seasons 1-2 only
Ian Shaw as Hazel
Rik Mayall as Kehaar
Elliot Henderson-Boyle as Pipkin
Stephen Fry as Cowslip
Kiefer Sutherland as Hickory
Stephen Gately as Blackavar
Kate Ashfield as Primrose
Tim McInnerny as Silverweed
Dawn French as Buttercup
Stephanie Morgenstern as Marigold
Anthony Barclay as Culoci
John Hurt as General Woundwort
Matt Wilkinson as the Weasel
Phill Jupitus as Dandelion
Jane Horrocks as Hannah
Tom Eastwood as Moss
Jo Rodriguez as Clover
Robert Harper as Strawberry
Janet Dale as Bark, Tassle, Frost, Katrina
Alice Welsh and Sean Welsh as Primrose's Bunnies

Season 3 only
Anthony Jackson as Kehaar, Cowslip
Maria Darling as Hannah, Pipkin, Clover
Paul Panting as Strawberry, Flax
Penny Freeman as Primrose, Marigold
Nigel Pegram as Hazel, Moss, General Woundwort, Dandelion 

These voices would also replace actors who left their roles from the first two seasons, but these roles are currently difficult for fans to identify who played which role, as season 3 credits only listed the actors' names and not the roles they played.

Characters

Watership Down
Hazel: The main protagonist of the series. Fiver's older brother. He leads the rabbits from Sandleford and eventually becomes Chief Rabbit of Watership Down. Although Hazel is not the strongest of the Watership Down rabbits, he is one of the most intelligent of the rabbits, he is also a charismatic leader who recognizes and employs the skills of his fellow bucks to great success. He is shot while freeing the hutch rabbits at Nuthanger Farm and almost dies, but is saved by his younger brother Fiver. Although lamed by this injury, he leads the foray to Efrafa and comes up with the final, successful strategy to defeat General Woundwort. Hazel's beautiful mate is Primrose, whom he freed from Efrafa.
Fiver: Hazel's younger brother. A shy and kind small runty rabbit whose visions of the destruction of the Sandleford warren lead him to leave, along with his older brother, Hazel and several other rabbits. He appears to be more prescient than his novel counterpart and his visions come in rhymes. He often feels responsible for foreseeing terrible things or blaming himself for their outcome. He and Hazel are very close.
Bigwig: A former an officer of the Sandleford Owsla, so-called because of the large amount of hair surrounding his face, giving him the appearance of a lionhead rabbit. The largest and most powerful of the Sandleford survivors, he is often blunt and impatient for dangerous action and fighting. After nearly getting killed in a snare in episode 3, he realizes that Fiver is right more often than not. He quickly befriends Kehaar and often asks for his help on Hazel's behalf. Hazel often selects him for the most dangerous missions, such as the infiltration of Efrafa. Later, he becomes captain of Watership Down's Owsla and falls for Spartina, a doe from Darkhaven.
Blackberry: A while a male in the original novel, in the TV series, Blackberry is a doe who is skilled with herbs and is referred to as the digging expert. As in the novel, she is the most intelligent of the rabbits, and often comes up with ingenious ideas. She is the only doe to go to Watership Down with Hazel and the others. Later in the series she falls in love with Campion. She is devastated when she thinks Campion is dead, but is rejoined with him when she is taken prisoner in Darkhaven. At the end of the series she and Campion return to Watership Down together.
Pipkin: A very young, adventurous rabbit eager to prove himself in the eyes of his bigger companions—particularly Hazel and Bigwig. He is the youngest of the Watership Down rabbits and has the gift of making friends with everyone including other animals in the Down area, to the point that when he is in trouble they will immediately join with the Watership Down rabbits to come to his rescue. Even Woundwort found he was not immune to Pipkin's charm and refused to kill him, saying that it would be like killing a part of himself. During the last season Pipkin grows up to be a responsible rabbit, even leading the "Junior Owsla".
Dandelion: Dandelion is an accomplished storyteller. He is a joker and a wise guy and provides much of the series' comedy relief. He is a good friend of Hawkbit, despite their mutual attraction to former Efrafan doe Heather (who later leaves with Moss to start a new warren) he and Hawkbit serve in Bigwig's Owsla together.
Hawkbit: He is a pessimistic, grouchy and sarcastic rabbit who always has a biting comment for every situation, but is a dependable member of the warren whenever help is needed. He has a kind of love/hate relationship with Fiver. He later becomes a good friend of the more cerebral Dandelion and during the last season, he settles down with Clover.
Holly: The former captain of the Sandleford Owsla, Holly has only a minor role and is mostly used as a background character. He formed a key part of the Watership Down defenses in the last season.
Clover: A former hutch rabbit rescued from Nuthanger Farm. She and Hawkbit settle down at the end of the series.
Primrose: Born in Redstone and a captive in Efrafa; until her rescue by the Watership Down rabbits. Primrose is very supportive of Hazel, who becomes her mate and is also a dedicated mother to her three children, Snowdrop, Mallow and Gilia, she and Campion also have a strong bond; due to her being saved by him multiple times back in Efrafa. In Efrafa she showed a rebellious and stubborn attitude toward Vervain, who bullied and tormented her at every given opportunity. Despite her deep hatred for Vervain, she, Fiver, Holly and Broom saved his life when he was caught in some wire, although she originally protested the idea of helping the rabbit "that made her life miserable". Later, she hates herself for letting him go when she finds out he formed an alliance out of fear with Woundwort. Primrose replaces the character of Hyzenthlay from the novel and film.
Blackavar: A captive in Efrafa with Primrose who was rescued by the Watership Down rabbits. Blackavar has only a minor role and is mostly used as a background character.
Strawberry: An orange rabbit who leaves Cowslip's warren after meeting Hazel and Bigwig and joins them in Watership Down. Initially lazy from his time with Cowslip, he later proves to be an accomplished digger and serves in Bigwig's Owsla.
Broom: The former captain of the Redstone Owsla. When Primrose, now free from Efrafa, returns to see her old friends Broom informs her that an unspecified illness has wiped out the entire warren but him. He joins the Watership Down rabbits at Hazel's invitation. He usually bores them with his tall tales, but does have wisdom (his knowledge about sheep helps avert a disaster) and can be relied upon in a crisis. He and Captain Holly also get along with each other.
Campion: Woundwort's most trusted subordinate. Campion sees that Woundwort's leadership is destroying Efrafa, but is torn between his feelings for the free ways of Watership Down and his loyalty to his chief rabbit. He met Blackberry and it was love at first sight, but he sacrificed himself to save his chief from a cave in. He survived; albeit horribly scarred and was taken to Darkhaven, as was Blackberry soon after, and they sealed their love in Darkhaven and escaped to Watership Down. He fought in the last battle against Woundwort. Afterwards, he and Blackberry settled down together.
Silverweed: He is a seer with mental powers similar to Fiver, in particular possessing the power to see into another rabbit's mind by touch. He is traded to Woundwort to help him seek his destiny and was taken away from the Warren of the Shining Wires to Darkhaven, but later ends up on Watership Down and becomes a good friend of the rabbits there, even sacrificing most of his youth to help save the warren from Woundwort.
Kehaar: A black-headed gull who is forced by an injured wing to take refuge on Watership Down. He is characterized by his frequent impatience, guttural accent and unusual phrasing. Eventually, after Hazel and the others befriend him, he flies over the countryside in an attempt to discover other warrens where the rabbits might find does to mate with. He discovers the Efrafan warren and after helping the rabbits he meets a gull called Gluk and flies to the city to settle down with her because she likes life in the city better.
Hannah: She is a brown mouse. Hannah is a good friend of Kehaar and has a kind of love/hate relationship with Bigwig who feels she is too small to be of any use in a fight, but her bravery more than makes up for her size. After Kehaar's departure, Hannah tries to learn magic to help her friends on the Down. Silverweed instead takes her magic into himself to save the Down. Although a mouse featured in the novel, it appeared only briefly, and spoke with a thick Italian accent.
Snowdrop: She is a white kit, and one of Hazel and Primrose's three children.
Mallow: He is a dark tan kit, and one of Hazel and Primrose's three children.
Gilia: She is a tan kit, and one of Hazel and Primrose's three children.

Cowslip's Warren (Warren of the Shining Wires)
Cowslip: The so-called leader of the warren, there is some doubt as to whether he is insane or totally evil. Hazel, Fiver and Bigwig first encounter him when they accompany Holly to recover an injured Sandleford rabbit left there, only to learn the warren's terrible secret when Bigwig nearly becomes a victim and that the missing rabbit was a victim. He becomes angered by Hazel's warren when they help a group of his rabbits escape from his warren and even helps Woundwort to get his revenge on them, however, as he himself states, "i'm a plotter, not a fighter" and he uses both sides for his own gain. Later he trades his seer, Silverweed to Woundwort in exchange for the destruction of his escaped rabbit's warren.

Efrafan Rabbits
Woundwort: The main antagonist of the series. A brutal and tyrannical leader who sees himself as the one doing everything for the best of his warren, Woundwort strives to destroy Hazel and his 'outsiders' because of the hope for free life they represent for his own subjects. He is a huge, burly rabbit with black, ragged fur and a blinded left eye. He deeply respects Campion, even after his betrayal by him, and he often punishes and threatens Vervain, but still values him as an adviser and loyal subject despite this. He briefly shows a softer side after Pipkin tells him that his parents were killed by a weasel (a fate that Woundwort himself went through) and for a brief moment before Efrafa's destruction sees himself for what he is and what he has brought Efrafa to. After the destruction of Efrafa, Woundwort becomes obsessed with seeking his destiny of destruction, which leads him to the warren he was born in; "Darkhaven". In the end, Woundwort is taken by the Black Rabbit of Inlé along with most of the Darkhaven rabbits.
Moss: Moss is a military rabbit who becomes leader of the Efrafa rabbits after the battle with the rabbits of Watership Down.
Vervain: Vervain is a cowardly and sneaky rabbit, more adept at spying on others and threatening the weaker ones than in actual combat and is (next to Woundwort) the most hated and despised rabbit of the Watership Down story. Despite his shortcomings, Woundwort values him (although he although he does not openly show it) for his loyalty to him. Although Campion saved his life on more than one occasion, Vervain hates him with a passion and would like nothing better than to make Woundwort realize Campion is a traitor. Kehaar is particularly not fond of Vervain and calls him an "ugly bunny". After Efrafa's destruction, Vervain tries to live on his own, but quickly loses hope; until he is saved by Woundwort from a weasel. Although somewhat shocked by his master's increasing madness, Vervain continues to serve him, although more out of fear than loyalty and he secretly longs to lead a different life, even if such thoughts are futile. At the end, Vervain flees from the final battle and is not seen again.

Redstone Rabbits
Hickory: The leader of Redstone Warren and the father of his kits. He and his mate, Marigold were soon joined by the Watership Down rabbits.
Marigold: Hickory's mate and the mother of her kits.

Nuthanger Farm
Duster: The farm's dog. He first appears in the first episode "The Promised Land" where he chases after the rabbits but fails in the process. He then has a small appearance in the episode "The Raid" where he barks at Hazel as he escapes from the barn. He also appeared in the episode "A Tale of a Mouse" in which he is guarding the farm's vegetables. At the end of the episode, he chases after the farm's cat, Tabitha. Duster's breed is somewhat of a Rottweiler.
Tabitha: The farm's cat. She also first appears in the first episode "The Promised Land" where she attacks Kehaar when he is trying to steal her bowl of fish. She then had a larger role in two episodes, "The Raid" and "A Tale of a Mouse". In "The Raid", she tries to attack and eat Hazel, Fiver and Pipkin when they are trying to free the hutch rabbits but fails. In "A Tale of a Mouse", she goes after the rabbits again, and also after Hannah. At the end, she is chased by Duster around the farm. Tabitha appears again in "The Betrayal" when she attacks Spartina in a barn on Nuthanger Farm, and is driven off by Bigwig and the others. Tabitha's breed is somewhat of a Tabby Cat or a Calico. Unlike Duster, she can speak (except her appearance in "The Promised Land").

Darkhaven Rabbits
Spartina: Spartina is one of Darkhaven's warrior does. She was chosen by Woundwort to trick the Watership Down rabbits into thinking that she is their friend, so she may spy on them and to find the location of their warren. However while she was there, Silverweed managed to see through her guise with his powers and she confessed everything to Hazel and the others, as she is beginning to have feelings for Bigwig. She returned to Darkhaven, in order to save Blackberry from being killed by Granite (under her orders), but she is soon held prisoner along with her. However she managed to escape along with Campion and Blackberry and aided the Watership Down rabbits in their fight against Woundwort. She settles down with Bigwig at Watership Down after the final battle.
Granite: Granite was the chief of Darkhaven, before losing his title to Campion during combat (which Campion later gave to Woundwort as soon as he arrived at Darkhaven) he is no doubt one of the warren's strongest rabbits. He was instructed by Spartina to kill Blackberry by the next full moon, however, since Blackberry once saved his life, Granite was unable to perform the deed, meaning that he does have a sense of honor. When the Black Rabbit of Inlé was summoned by Silverweed, Granite fled for his life, leaving his fate unknown.
Shale: Shale is a rabbit from the Darkhaven Owsla who followed Woundwort's orders to destroy Watership Down. In the final battle, he, along with Feldspar and the rest of the Darkhaven rabbits, were taken by the Black Rabbit of Inlé.
Feldspar: Feldspar is a rabbit from the Darkhaven Owsla who follows General Woundwort's orders to destroy Watership Down. He is always seen with Granite, Spartina and Shale. In the final battle, he, along with Shale and the rest of the Darkhaven rabbits, were taken by the Black Rabbit of Inlé.
Speaker of the Past: Speaker of the Past is a rabbit who teaches other rabbits about Darkhaven and how it was made. When the law of trying to heal the weak is broken, she cannot protect a student who violated it. During the last battle at Watership Down, her fate is left unknown.

Episodes

Season 1

Season 2

Season 3
 Season 3 Episode Titles Error Because the only countries in Europe which aired the third TV series were Germany and Greece, the fan site Thank U Stars provided translations of each episode title directly from the German titles. However sites like play.com and tv.com have found and used the German translated titles and the unofficial ones found on the DVD releases or on screen as they appear at the beginning of each episode, mostly because this season also aired in North America.

Unproduced episode
According to the official Watership Down TV series website (which is now closed) Season 2 was supposed to have an episode produced called Dandelion's Big Story, in which he would tell a story to the younger rabbits, with the roles of El-ahrairah, Prince Rainbow, etc. played by the Watership Down rabbits, while Hazel and Bigwig went to Nuthanger Farm on a raid. However, the episode was never produced and was instead replaced by Bigwig's Way. Even so, the episode title and synopsis managed to find its way on to the 14-disc Region 2 DVD set by Universal Pictures/Right Entertainment, where it replaced Bigwig's Way. As the penultimate season 2 episode it was oddly placed within the DVD set; it is to be found on disc 10 preceding episodes from season 3 The Nestling and The Secret of Redstone.

Soundtrack
The official soundtrack for the series was produced by Mike Batt with the aid of the Royal Philharmonic Orchestra. He had also gathered an array of stars to provide their voices for some of the songs. As well as Stephen Gately performing Bright Eyes, Art Garfunkel who had sung Bright Eyes for the film sang When You're Losing Your Way In The Rain, Cerys Matthews from the group Catatonia performed Thank You, Stars which was used in the series as a romance theme for Hazel and Primrose and Paul Carrack from the group Mike + The Mechanics performed Winter Song, though the song wasn't used, an instrumental piece was in the Winter on Watership Down two parter. Mike himself sang for the soundtrack, performing the song The View from a Hill which oddly enough was used in the series, but only in the German version and sung by an uncredited singer, and British voice actor Gary Martin provided the narration for the story of Frith's Blessing for the original release of the CD soundtrack, though in the TV series, it was Dandelion who told the tale of Frith's Blessing. Andrew Lloyd Webber composed a song called Fields of Sun for the soundtrack. Although this song was neither used in the show nor made available on the official soundtrack, he was still credited for the song's creation during the opening credits.

The soundtrack was re-released as part of the Mike Batt Music Cube in December 2009 by Dramatico Records. However, only the orchestral pieces are on the CD and none of the recorded songs are present. The re-released soundtrack has recently become available separately from the Cube in a 2-CD set, along with the soundtrack to the film Caravans.

Currently, the music cube re-released version of the soundtrack is also available to download in Mp3 format from Amazon's UK website.

Home media releases

United Kingdom
In 1999 and 2000, three VHS tapes containing episodes of the first series were released by Buena Vista Home Entertainment - "Journey to Watership Down", "Winter on Watership Down" and "Escape from Efraia". They were also released as mail-order releases through Reader's Digest.

By 2002, Entertainment Rights acquired the home video rights to the series in the UK and released the series through their Right Entertainment division, with Universal Pictures Video distributing. In October 2005, a Region 2 DVD box set of all three seasons were released in the UK.

United States
The series was released on VHS and DVD in the United States by GoodTimes Entertainment and Reader's Digest Video. However, despite that, there has never been any proof showing that the show aired in the US, leading to the point where it was concluded that it didn't air in the US.

Australia
In Australia, Umbrella Entertainment released the series on DVD.

Notes
Bigwig's motto for the owsla is "Who Dares Wins", the motto of the SAS. The phrase was also used as an epigraph for the first story in Tales from Watership Down.

References

External links

1990s British animated television series
2000s British animated television series
1999 British television series debuts
2001 British television series endings
1990s Canadian animated television series
2000s Canadian animated television series
1999 Canadian television series debuts
2001 Canadian television series endings
British children's animated adventure television series
British children's animated comedy television series
British children's animated fantasy television series
Canadian children's animated adventure television series
Canadian children's animated comedy television series
Canadian children's animated fantasy television series
English-language television shows
YTV (Canadian TV channel) original programming
Television series by DHX Media
Television shows based on British novels
British television shows based on children's books
Animated television shows based on films
Animated television series about rabbits and hares
Television shows set in Hampshire